Aubrey Bürer (born 13 March 1939) is a South African former swimmer. He competed in three events at the 1960 Summer Olympics.

References

1939 births
Living people
South African male swimmers
Olympic swimmers of South Africa
Swimmers at the 1960 Summer Olympics
Swimmers from Johannesburg